Josef Zeman may refer to:
 Josef Zeman (footballer)
 Josef Zeman (wrestler)
 Josef Zeman (weightlifter)

See also
 Josef Zemann (1923–2022), Austrian mineralogist and geologist